Linz International School Auhof (LISA) is a Public secondary school offering the International Baccalaureate (IB) Diploma as well as the Austrian school leaving certificate (Matura). The language of instruction is English. LISA is administrated as one of three school branches of the Europagymnasium Auhof. As of 2009, approximately 450 students attend this school branch.

English is used as a language of instruction in all subjects. English teaching materials are adapted by the teachers to suit the difficulty level of the students. Language assistants encourage students to try out new words and structures. These situations promote natural conversation with native speakers and the students have the opportunity to practice English in practically all of the subjects. Tutorials, which take place primarily in the first year, are lessons in which only two students work with one native speaker. In that way, the students do not only receive full attention, but also experience their own language skills more directly. Student-centered work with authentic English resources is among the most common methods applied from the very beginning.

Excursions and projects
In order to promote inter-cultural understanding, international exchanges and project weeks are an integral part of the LISA curriculum. The following activities take place during the 8 school years:

year 1: Getting-to-know-you days in Königswiesen
year 2: Winter-Sport-Days
year 3: Project week in Spital am Pyhrn
year 4: England trip: London and Tollesbury
year 5: Japan Exchange (for a small group of students)
year 6: International exchange program (South Africa, USA, Canada, etc.)
year 7: Trip to France/Ireland
year 8: Science excursion to Munich

During the past years, student exchanges to Singapore and Thailand were also conducted during the summer holidays.

The quarterly published LISA 4 U (for download) contains student articles on trips all current events at the school.

External links
 LISA

Schools in Linz
International Baccalaureate schools in Austria
Educational institutions established in 1992
1992 establishments in Austria